Bematha is a genus of moths of the family Erebidae. The genus was erected by Francis Walker in 1865.

Species
Bematha extensa Walker, 1865
Bematha pectoralis Walker, 1864 = Gespanna pectoralis Walker, 1864
Bematha transversata Wileman & West 1929

References

Calpinae
Noctuoidea genera